The 2014 World University Cycling Championship is the 6th World University Cycling Championship (5th according to the organisation) sponsored by the International University Sports Federation (FISU) and sanctioned by the Union Cycliste Internationale (UCI). The championship will take place in Jelenia Góra, Poland from 9 to 13 July 2014.

Participation
Each country may enter a maximum of twenty competitors with limited number of competitors per event. For road cycling there is a maximum of 4 men and 4 women per discipline and for the mountainbike events a maximum of six 6 men and 6 women per discipline per country.

Schedule
 Wednesday, 9 July 2014
 Road cycling: women's time trial, 23 km
 Road cycling: men's time trial, 23 km
 Thursday, 10 July 2014
 Road cycling: women's road race, 66 km
 Road cycling: men's road race, 94 km
 Saturday, 12 July 2014
 Mountainbike: women's time trial, 4 km
 Mountainbike: men's time trial, 4 km
 Sunday 13 July 2014
 Mountainbike: women's mass start, 18 km
 Mountainbike: men's mass start, 26 km

Events summary

Road Cycling

Mountainbiking

Medal table

Source

References

External links

 
International University Sports Federation – Cycling

World University Cycling Championships
World University Cycling Championship
World University Cycling Championship
International cycle races hosted by Poland
Jelenia Góra
World University Cycling Championship
World University Cycling Championship
Cycling
World University Cycling Championship
World University Cycling Championship